Thorsten Schneider is a German professional footballer who currently plays for VfL Sindelfingen. He plays as a forward and attacking midfielder.

Career
Thorsten Schneider signed a semi-professional contract with a fifth division club in Germany, before joining Geylang International in 2014.

Schneider debuted for the club against Tampines Rovers in the first group match of the 2014 StarHub League Cup. The Eagles won 2–1 against the Stags in that match.

In his second professional match against Warriors in the same competition, he scored his first goal for the club in the second half.

References

Living people
1987 births
Association football midfielders
German footballers
Geylang International FC players
Singapore Premier League players
Expatriate footballers in Singapore
People from Böblingen
Sportspeople from Stuttgart (region)
Footballers from Baden-Württemberg